Imuracetam is a drug of the racetam family.  It was under development in the 1970s, but was never marketed.

References

Racetams
Pyrrolidones
Ureas
Abandoned drugs